West Palm Beach station is an inter-city rail station in West Palm Beach, Florida. It is served by Brightline, connecting Miami and in the future, Orlando International Airport. The station is located in downtown West Palm Beach, on Evernia Street between Rosemary Avenue and Quadrille Boulevard.  This is about half a mile east of Amtrak and Tri-Rail's West Palm Beach station and half a mile south of the older Florida East Coast Railway station that operated on the same tracks in the first half of the 1900s, next to where Quadrille Boulevard turns south after crossing the Flagler Memorial Bridge.

History 
The station is a Modern style structure with illuminated V-shaped columns supporting the upper concourse echoing the designs of the Miami and Fort Lauderdale stations also under construction on the line.  It was planned and designed by Skidmore, Owings & Merrill in association with Zyscovich Architects. It was completed in late 2017.

Foundation pouring at the site to construct the $29 million station occurred in early 2016. In March 2016 the raising of the 18 V shaped pillars began. Earlier in the month, a 130-foot (39-meter) crane toppled over at the site with no injuries.

Brightline launched its first passenger service in January 2018 with several daily trains to Fort Lauderdale. Future plans include extending the service to other stations.

Tri-Rail Coastal Link 
The South Florida Regional Transportation Authority, which operates the Tri-Rail commuter train, proposed the construction of a Downtown West Palm Beach station (also planned as Evernia Street station) co-located with the current station.

References

External links 

West Palm Beach station – Brightline

Brightline stations
train station
Railway stations in the United States opened in 2018
Transportation buildings and structures in Palm Beach County, Florida
2018 establishments in Florida
West Palm Beach, Florida
Tri-Rail stations in Palm Beach County, Florida
Proposed Tri-Rail stations
Skidmore, Owings & Merrill buildings